Theoretical astronomy is the use of analytical and computational models based on principles from physics and chemistry to describe and explain astronomical objects and astronomical phenomena. Theorists in astronomy endeavor to create theoretical models and from the results predict observational consequences of those models. The observation of a phenomenon predicted by a model allows astronomers to select between several alternate or conflicting models as the one best able to describe the phenomena.

Ptolemy's Almagest, although a brilliant treatise on theoretical astronomy combined with a practical handbook for computation, nevertheless includes compromises to reconcile discordant observations with a geocentric model. Modern theoretical astronomy is usually assumed to have begun with the work of Johannes Kepler (1571–1630), particularly with Kepler's laws. The history of the descriptive and theoretical aspects of the Solar System mostly spans from the late sixteenth century to the end of the nineteenth century. 

Theoretical astronomy is built on the work of observational astronomy, astrometry, astrochemistry, and astrophysics. Astronomy was early to adopt computational techniques to model stellar and galactic formation and celestial mechanics. From the point of view of theoretical astronomy, not only must the mathematical expression be reasonably accurate but it should preferably exist in a form which is amenable to further mathematical analysis when used in specific problems. Most of theoretical astronomy uses Newtonian theory of gravitation, considering that the effects of general relativity are weak for most celestial objects. Theoretical astronomy does not attempt to predict the position, size and temperature of every object in the universe, but by and large has concentrated upon analyzing the apparently complex but periodic motions of celestial objects.

Integrating astronomy and physics

"Contrary to the belief generally held by laboratory physicists, astronomy has contributed to the growth of our understanding of physics." Physics has helped in the elucidation of astronomical phenomena, and astronomy has helped in the elucidation of physical phenomena:
 discovery of the law of gravitation came from the information provided by the motion of the Moon and the planets,
 viability of nuclear fusion as demonstrated in the Sun and stars and yet to be reproduced on earth in a controlled form.

Integrating astronomy with physics involves

The aim of astronomy is to understand the physics and chemistry from the laboratory that is behind cosmic events so as to enrich our understanding of the cosmos and of these sciences as well.

Integrating astronomy and chemistry

Astrochemistry, the overlap of the disciplines of astronomy and chemistry, is the study of the abundance and reactions of chemical elements and molecules in space, and their interaction with radiation. The formation, atomic and chemical composition, evolution and fate of molecular gas clouds, is of special interest because it is from these clouds that solar systems form.

Infrared astronomy, for example, has revealed that the interstellar medium contains a suite of complex gas-phase carbon compounds called aromatic hydrocarbons, often abbreviated (PAHs or PACs). These molecules composed primarily of fused rings of carbon (either neutral or in an ionized state) are said to be the most common class of carbon compound in the galaxy. They are also the most common class of carbon molecule in meteorites and in cometary and asteroidal dust (cosmic dust). These compounds, as well as the amino acids, nucleobases, and many other compounds in meteorites, carry deuterium (2H) and isotopes of carbon, nitrogen, and oxygen that are very rare on earth, attesting to their extraterrestrial origin. The PAHs are thought to form in hot circumstellar environments (around dying carbon rich red giant stars).

The sparseness of interstellar and interplanetary space results in some unusual chemistry, since symmetry-forbidden reactions cannot occur except on the longest of timescales. For this reason, molecules and molecular ions which are unstable on earth can be highly abundant in space, for example the H3+ ion. Astrochemistry overlaps with astrophysics and nuclear physics in characterizing the nuclear reactions which occur in stars, the consequences for stellar evolution, as well as stellar 'generations'. Indeed, the nuclear reactions in stars produce every naturally occurring chemical element. As the stellar 'generations' advance, the mass of the newly formed elements increases. A first-generation star uses elemental hydrogen (H) as a fuel source and produces helium (He). Hydrogen is the most abundant element, and it is the basic building block for all other elements as its nucleus has only one proton. Gravitational pull toward the center of a star creates massive amounts of heat and pressure, which cause nuclear fusion. Through this process of merging nuclear mass, heavier elements are formed. Lithium, carbon, nitrogen and oxygen are examples of elements that form in stellar fusion. After many stellar generations, very heavy elements are formed (e.g. iron and lead).

Tools of theoretical astronomy
Theoretical astronomers use a wide variety of tools which include analytical models (for example, polytropes to approximate the behaviors of a star) and computational numerical simulations. Each has some advantages. Analytical models of a process are generally better for giving insight into the heart of what is going on. Numerical models can reveal the existence of phenomena and effects that would otherwise not be seen.

Astronomy theorists endeavor to create theoretical models and figure out the observational consequences of those models. This helps observers look for data that can refute a model or help in choosing between several alternate or conflicting models.

Theorists also try to generate or modify models to take into account new data. Consistent with the general scientific approach, in the case of an inconsistency, the general tendency is to try to make minimal modifications to the model to fit the data. In some cases, a large amount of inconsistent data over time may lead to total abandonment of a model.

Topics of theoretical astronomy
Topics studied by theoretical astronomers include:
 stellar dynamics and evolution;
 galaxy formation;
 large-scale structure of matter in the Universe;
 origin of cosmic rays;
 general relativity and physical cosmology, including string cosmology and astroparticle physics.

Astrophysical relativity serves as a tool to gauge the properties of large scale structures for which gravitation plays a significant role in physical phenomena investigated and as the basis for black hole physics and the study of gravitational waves.

Astronomical models
Some widely accepted and studied theories and models in astronomy, now included in the Lambda-CDM model are the Big Bang, Cosmic inflation, dark matter, and fundamental theories of physics.

A few examples of this process:

Leading topics in theoretical astronomy
Dark matter and dark energy are the current leading topics in astronomy, as their discovery and controversy originated during the study of the galaxies.

Theoretical astrophysics
Of the topics approached with the tools of theoretical physics, particular consideration is often given to stellar photospheres, stellar atmospheres, the solar atmosphere, planetary atmospheres, gaseous nebulae, nonstationary stars, and the interstellar medium. Special attention is given to the internal structure of stars.

Weak equivalence principle
The observation of a neutrino burst within 3 h of the associated optical burst from Supernova 1987A in the Large Magellanic Cloud (LMC) gave theoretical astrophysicists an opportunity to test that neutrinos and photons follow the same trajectories in the gravitational field of the galaxy.

Thermodynamics for stationary black holes
A general form of the first law of thermodynamics for stationary black holes can be derived from the microcanonical functional integral for the gravitational field. The boundary data
 the gravitational field as described with a microcanonical system in a spatially finite region and
 the density of states expressed formally as a functional integral over Lorentzian metrics and as a functional of the geometrical boundary data that are fixed in the corresponding action,
are the thermodynamical extensive variables, including the energy and angular momentum of the system. For the simpler case of nonrelativistic mechanics as is often observed in astrophysical phenomena associated with a black hole event horizon, the density of states can be expressed as a real-time functional integral and subsequently used to deduce Feynman's imaginary-time functional integral for the canonical partition function.

Theoretical astrochemistry
Reaction equations and large reaction networks are an important tool in theoretical astrochemistry, especially as applied to the gas-grain chemistry of the interstellar medium. Theoretical astrochemistry offers the prospect of being able to place constraints on the inventory of organics for exogenous delivery to the early Earth.

Interstellar organics
"An important goal for theoretical astrochemistry is to elucidate which organics are of true interstellar origin, and to identify possible interstellar precursors and reaction pathways for those molecules which are the result of aqueous alterations." One of the ways this goal can be achieved is through the study of carbonaceous material as found in some meteorites. Carbonaceous chondrites (such as C1 and C2) include organic compounds such as amines and amides; alcohols, aldehydes, and ketones; aliphatic and aromatic hydrocarbons; sulfonic and phosphonic acids; amino, hydroxycarboxylic, and carboxylic acids; purines and pyrimidines; and kerogen-type material. The organic inventories of primitive meteorites display large and variable enrichments in deuterium, carbon-13 (13C), and nitrogen-15 (15N), which is indicative of their retention of an interstellar heritage.

Chemistry in cometary comae
The chemical composition of comets should reflect both the conditions in the outer solar nebula some 4.5 × 109 ayr, and the nature of the natal interstellar cloud from which the Solar System was formed. While comets retain a strong signature of their ultimate interstellar origins, significant processing must have occurred in the protosolar nebula. Early models of coma chemistry showed that reactions can occur rapidly in the inner coma, where the most important reactions are proton transfer reactions. Such reactions can potentially cycle deuterium between the different coma molecules, altering the initial D/H ratios released from the nuclear ice, and necessitating the construction of accurate models of cometary deuterium chemistry, so that gas-phase coma observations can be safely extrapolated to give nuclear D/H ratios.

Theoretical chemical astronomy
While the lines of conceptual understanding between theoretical astrochemistry and theoretical chemical astronomy often become blurred so that the goals and tools are the same, there are subtle differences between the two sciences. Theoretical chemistry as applied to astronomy seeks to find new ways to observe chemicals in celestial objects, for example. This often leads to theoretical astrochemistry having to seek new ways to describe or explain those same observations.

Astronomical spectroscopy
The new era of chemical astronomy had to await the clear enunciation of the chemical principles of spectroscopy and the applicable theory.

Chemistry of dust condensation
Supernova radioactivity dominates light curves and the chemistry of dust condensation is also dominated by radioactivity. Dust is usually either carbon or oxides depending on which is more abundant, but Compton electrons dissociate the CO molecule in about one month. The new chemical astronomy of supernova solids depends on the supernova radioactivity:
 the radiogenesis of 44Ca from 44Ti decay after carbon condensation establishes their supernova source,
 their opacity suffices to shift emission lines blueward after 500 d and emits significant infrared luminosity,
 parallel kinetic rates determine trace isotopes in meteoritic supernova graphites,
 the chemistry is kinetic rather than due to thermal equilibrium and
 is made possible by radiodeactivation of the CO trap for carbon.

Theoretical physical astronomy
Like theoretical chemical astronomy, the lines of conceptual understanding between theoretical astrophysics and theoretical physical astronomy are often blurred, but, again, there are subtle differences between these two sciences. Theoretical physics as applied to astronomy seeks to find new ways to observe physical phenomena in celestial objects and what to look for, for example. This often leads to theoretical astrophysics having to seek new ways to describe or explain those same observations, with hopefully a convergence to improve our understanding of the local environment of Earth and the physical Universe.

Weak interaction and nuclear double beta decay
Nuclear matrix elements of relevant operators as extracted from data and from a shell-model and theoretical approximations both for the two-neutrino and neutrinoless modes of decay are used to explain the weak interaction and nuclear structure aspects of nuclear double beta decay.

Neutron-rich isotopes
New neutron-rich isotopes, 34Ne, 37Na, and 43Si have been produced unambiguously for the first time, and convincing evidence for the particle instability of three others, 33Ne, 36Na, and 39Mg has been obtained. These experimental findings compare with recent theoretical predictions.

Theory of astronomical time keeping

Until recently all the time units that appear natural to us are caused by astronomical phenomena:
 Earth's orbit around the Sun => the year, and the seasons,
 Moon's orbit around the Earth => the month,
 Earth's rotation and the succession of brightness and darkness => the day (and night).

High precision appears problematic:
 ambiguities arise in the exact definition of a rotation or revolution,
 some astronomical processes are uneven and irregular, such as the noncommensurability of year, month, and day,
 there are a multitude of time scales and calendars to solve the first two problems.

Some of these time standard scales are sidereal time, solar time, and universal time.

Atomic time

From the Systeme Internationale (SI) comes the second as defined by the duration of 9 192 631 770 cycles of a particular hyperfine structure transition in the ground state of caesium-133 (133Cs). For practical usability a device is required that attempts to produce the SI second (s) such as an atomic clock. But not all such clocks agree. The weighted mean of many clocks distributed over the whole Earth defines the Temps Atomique International; i.e., the Atomic Time TAI. From the General theory of relativity the time measured depends on the altitude on earth and the spatial velocity of the clock so that TAI refers to a location on sea level that rotates with the Earth.

Ephemeris time

Since the Earth's rotation is irregular, any time scale derived from it such as Greenwich Mean Time led to recurring problems in predicting the Ephemerides for the positions of the Moon, Sun, planets and their natural satellites. In 1976 the International Astronomical Union (IAU) resolved that the theoretical basis for ephemeris time (ET) was wholly non-relativistic, and therefore, beginning in 1984 ephemeris time would be replaced by two further time scales with allowance for relativistic corrections. Their names, assigned in 1979, emphasized their dynamical nature or origin, Barycentric Dynamical Time (TDB) and Terrestrial Dynamical Time (TDT). Both were defined for continuity with ET and were based on what had become the standard SI second, which in turn had been derived from the measured second of ET.

During the period 1991–2006, the TDB and TDT time scales were both redefined and replaced, owing to difficulties or inconsistencies in their original definitions. The current fundamental relativistic time scales are Geocentric Coordinate Time (TCG) and Barycentric Coordinate Time (TCB). Both of these have rates that are based on the SI second in respective reference frames (and hypothetically outside the relevant gravity well), but due to relativistic effects, their rates would appear slightly faster when observed at the Earth's surface, and therefore diverge from local Earth-based time scales using the SI second at the Earth's surface.

The currently defined IAU time scales also include Terrestrial Time (TT) (replacing TDT, and now defined as a re-scaling of TCG, chosen to give TT a rate that matches the SI second when observed at the Earth's surface), and a redefined Barycentric Dynamical Time (TDB), a re-scaling of TCB to give TDB a rate that matches the SI second at the Earth's surface.

Extraterrestrial time-keeping

Stellar dynamical time scale
For a star, the dynamical time scale is defined as the time that would be taken for a test particle released at the surface to fall under the star's potential to the centre point, if pressure forces were negligible. In other words, the dynamical time scale measures the amount of time it would take a certain star to collapse in the absence of any internal pressure. By appropriate manipulation of the equations of stellar structure this can be found to be

where R is the radius of the star, G is the gravitational constant, M is the mass of the star and v is the escape velocity. As an example, the Sun dynamical time scale is approximately 1133 seconds. Note that the actual time it would take a star like the Sun to collapse is greater because internal pressure is present.

The 'fundamental' oscillatory mode of a star will be at approximately the dynamical time scale. Oscillations at this frequency are seen in Cepheid variables.

Theory of astronomical navigation

On Earth
The basic characteristics of applied astronomical navigation are
 usable in all areas of sailing around the Earth,
 applicable autonomously (does not depend on others – persons or states) and passively (does not emit energy),
 conditional usage via optical visibility (of horizon and celestial bodies), or state of cloudiness,
 precisional measurement, sextant is 0.1', altitude and position is between 1.5' and 3.0'.
 temporal determination takes a couple of minutes (using the most modern equipment) and ≤ 30 min (using classical equipment).

The superiority of satellite navigation systems to astronomical navigation are currently undeniable, especially with the development and use of GPS/NAVSTAR. This global satellite system
 enables automated three-dimensional positioning at any moment,
 automatically determines position continuously (every second or even more often),
 determines position independent of weather conditions (visibility and cloudiness),
 determines position in real time to a few meters (two carrying frequencies) and 100 m (modest commercial receivers), which is two to three orders of magnitude better than by astronomical observation,
 is simple even without expert knowledge,
 is relatively cheap, comparable to equipment for astronomical navigation, and
 allows incorporation into integrated and automated systems of control and ship steering. The use of astronomical or celestial navigation is disappearing from the surface and beneath or above the surface of the Earth.

Geodetic astronomy is the application of astronomical methods into networks and technical projects of geodesy for
 apparent places of stars, and their proper motions
 precise astronomical navigation
 astro-geodetic geoid determination and
 modelling the rock densities of the topography and of geological layers in the subsurface
 Satellite geodesy using the stellar background (see also astrometry and cosmic triangulation)
 Monitoring of the Earth rotation and polar wandering
 Contribution to the time system of physics and geosciences

Astronomical algorithms are the algorithms used to calculate ephemerides, calendars, and positions (as in celestial navigation or satellite navigation).

Many astronomical and navigational computations use the Figure of the Earth as a surface representing the Earth.

The International Earth Rotation and Reference Systems Service (IERS), formerly the International Earth Rotation Service, is the body responsible for maintaining global time and reference frame standards, notably through its Earth Orientation Parameter (EOP) and International Celestial Reference System (ICRS) groups.

Deep space

The Deep Space Network, or DSN, is an international network of large antennas and communication facilities that supports interplanetary spacecraft missions, and radio and radar astronomy observations for the exploration of the Solar System and the universe. The network also supports selected Earth-orbiting missions. DSN is part of the NASA Jet Propulsion Laboratory (JPL).

Aboard an exploratory vehicle
An observer becomes a deep space explorer upon escaping Earth's orbit. While the Deep Space Network maintains communication and enables data download from an exploratory vessel, any local probing performed by sensors or active systems aboard usually require astronomical navigation, since the enclosing network of satellites to ensure accurate positioning is absent.

See also
 Astrochemistry
 Astrometry
 Astrophysics
 Celestial mechanics
 Celestial navigation
 Celestial sphere
 Orbital mechanics

References

External links
 Introduction to Cataclysmic Variables (CVs)
 L. Sidoli, 2008 Transient outburst mechanisms
 Commentary on "The Compendium of Plain Astronomy" is a manuscript from 1665 about theoretical astronomy

Applied and interdisciplinary physics
Astrometry
Astronomical imaging
Astronomical sub-disciplines
Astronomical coordinate systems
Observational astronomy
Space science
Stellar astronomy